The third series of the revived British science fiction programme Doctor Who, and the twenty-ninth season of the show overall, was preceded by the 2006 Christmas special "The Runaway Bride". Following the special, a regular series of thirteen episodes was broadcast, starting with "Smith and Jones" on 31 March 2007 and ending with "Last of the Time Lords" on 30 June 2007. In addition, a 13-part animated serial (equivalent to one regular episode) was produced and broadcast as part of Totally Doctor Who.

The series stars David Tennant as the tenth incarnation of the Doctor, an alien Time Lord who travels through time and space in his TARDIS, which appears to be a British police box on the outside. In the Christmas special he is joined by Catherine Tate as Donna Noble. The series also introduces Freema Agyeman as the Doctor's new companion Martha Jones, who leaves at the end of the series due to the fact that her family need support whilst recovering from the events of the series finale, which involved her mother, sister and brother being tortured. John Barrowman also reprises his role as Captain Jack Harkness in the final three episodes which serve as the finale. The series is connected by a loose story arc consisting of the recurring phrase "Vote Saxon", which ultimately is revealed to be the return of the Doctor's enemy Time Lord the Master, first played by Derek Jacobi before regenerating into John Simm.

Episodes

Three episodes from Series 3 were adapted from previously published works: "Human Nature" / "The Family of Blood" was adapted by Paul Cornell from his own New Adventures novel, also entitled Human Nature, while "Blink" originated as a short story in the 2006 Doctor Who annual by Steven Moffat called "What I Did on My Christmas Holidays' By Sally Sparrow".

"Human Nature" is also the first instance of the Doctor's previous incarnations prior to his ninth being explicitly referenced in the revived era through the sketches in The Journal of Impossible Things.

Supplemental episode 
A 13-part animated serial, The Infinite Quest, was produced and broadcast as part of the children's programme Totally Doctor Who on CBBC, leading up to the finale of series 3. Each instalment was approximately  minutes in length and, when compiled, was equivalent to a regular episode. The serial was broadcast in its entirety on 30 June 2007 and later released on DVD.

Casting

Main characters
Series 3 was David Tennant's second series in the role of the Doctor, during which he is joined by three companions: Donna Noble, Martha Jones and Captain Jack Harkness.

Actress and comedian Catherine Tate was cast as one-off companion Donna Noble for the Christmas special. At the end of the episode the character turns down the chance to travel in the TARDIS, but Tate later reprised her role and returned for a full series starting in the 2008 episode "Partners in Crime".

Following the departure of Billie Piper as Rose Tyler at the end of Series 2, a new full-time companion was needed. On 5 July 2006, the BBC confirmed that Freema Agyeman would join the show as new companion Martha Jones. Agyeman had previously appeared in the 2006 episode "Army of Ghosts". John Barrowman also returned as Captain Jack Harkness for the three-part series finale.

Guest stars
Recurring guest stars for the series included Adjoa Andoh, Trevor Laird, Gugu Mbatha-Raw and Reggie Yates, who portrayed Martha's family.

Other guest stars included Thelma Barlow, Ryan Carnes, Matthew Chambers, Chipo Chung, Christina Cole, Michelle Collins, Lenora Crichlow, Anthony Flanagan, Andrew Garfield, Lucy Gaskell, Mark Gatiss, Don Gilet, Jennifer Hennessy, Anna Hope, Gerard Horan, Jessica Hynes, Derek Jacobi, Dean Lennox Kelly, Matt King, Chris Larkin, Harry Lloyd, Eric Loren, Stephen Marcus, Roy Marsden, McFly, Alexandra Moen, Carey Mulligan, Michael Obiora, Ardal O'Hanlon, Travis Oliver, Sharon Osbourne, Sarah Parish, Angela Pleasence, Hugh Quarshie, Miranda Raison, Anne Reid, Finlay Robertson, Thomas Sangster, John Simm, Rebekah Staton and Ann Widdecombe.

Production

Development

Following the success of the first  series, the BBC announced that Doctor Who had been recommissioned for a third series on 16 June 2005, only two months after the announcement of the second series. Recording for the Christmas special began on 4 July 2006, with production on the series itself beginning on 8 August 2006 and concluding on 2 April 2007.

Writing
First-time writers for the show included Gareth Roberts, who previously wrote the interactive episode "Attack of the Graske" and the TARDISODEs, Helen Raynor, one of the show's script editors, Chris Chibnall, the head writer and co-producer of spin-off series Torchwood, and Stephen Greenhorn. Previous writers Paul Cornell, Steven Moffat and Russell T Davies all contributed to the series, with Davies continuing to act as head writer and executive producer. Phil Collinson and Susie Liggat acted as producers, with Julie Gardner as executive producer. Euros Lyn, Charles Palmer, Richard Clark, James Strong, Graeme Harper, Hettie MacDonald and Colin Teague directed episodes in the series.

The episodes in series three are arranged in a loose story arc: "Mr Saxon", an alias for the Master. The character's name was first mentioned in "The Runaway Bride"; the Ministry of Defence shot down an alien craft at Saxon's request. Several elements from episodes in the series are contributory to the three-part finale: the events of "The Lazarus Experiment" and "42" were directly influenced by the Master; the Face of Boe's prophecy is directly related to Master; and a similar fob-watch that was used by the Doctor to change his Time Lord biology into human was also used by the Master to hide from the Time Lords.

Music
Murray Gold composed the music, with orchestration by Ben Foster.

Filming

Production blocks were arranged as follows:

An animated serial, The Infinite Quest, was also produced alongside the series and was broadcast as part of the CBBC programme Totally Doctor Who.

Release

Broadcast
The third series premiered on 31 March 2007 with "Smith and Jones", and concluded after 13 episodes on 30 June 2007 with "Last of the Time Lords". The series was initially planned to conclude a week earlier, but on 2 May 2007, episodes 7–13 were pushed back a week due to the Eurovision Song Contest 2007, rather than air "42" in an earlier timeslot. Doctor Who Confidential also aired alongside each episode of the series, continuing on from the previous series.

Home media

Reception

Critical reception
Arnold T. Blumberg of IGN gave an overwhelmingly positive review of the third series. He praised the acting of Tennant, Agyeman and John Simm, describing Simm's portrayal as "a master stroke". Overall he said, "With an assured air earned by success, Series 3 of Doctor Who is a tour de force excursion across time and space...it doesn't get much better than this". He gave the series 9 out of 10 (Amazing).
Nick Lyons of DVD Talk gave a positive review saying, "series three is on par with the last two seasons of the new series." He said that the character of Martha and series three, "will no doubt please fans". He gave the series 4 and a half stars out of 5.

Awards and nominations

Soundtrack
Selected pieces of score from this series (and "Voyage of the Damned"), as composed by Murray Gold, were released on 5 November 2007 by Silva Screen Records.

References

External links 

 
 
 

Series 03
 
Series 03
2006 British television seasons
2007 British television seasons